Amphicallia is a genus of moths in the subfamily Arctiinae erected by Per Olof Christopher Aurivillius in 1900.

Species
 Amphicallia bellatrix Dalman, 1823
 Amphicallia kostlani Strand, 1911
 Amphicallia pactolicus Butler, 1888
 Amphicallia pratti Kenrick, 1914
 Amphicallia quagga Strand, 1909
 Amphicallia solai Druce, 1907
 Amphicallia thelwalli Druce, 1882
 A. t. thelwalli
 A. t. tigris Butler, 1892
 A. t. zebra Rogenhofer, 1894

References

Arctiinae
Moth genera